Angaur Airstrip (Japanese: アンガウル飛行場, Hepburn: Angauru hikōjō) is a small airstrip on Angaur, one of the islands of Palau. It also served as an airfield during World War II.

History

World War II

The day the island was declared secured on September 20, 1944, construction of the airfield began on the eastern edge of the island. As there was no existing airfield to build on, two Army engineering battalions had to clear jungle and level the terrain to create the airfield. On 19 October 1944 the airfield with its  runway aligned NE/SW together with taxiways and hardstands for 120 aircraft were ready for use.

The 494th Bombardment Group operating B-24J Liberator bombers arrived at Angaur on 16 October and commenced operations on 3 November. The Wing remained at Angaur until June 1945 when it moved to Yontan Airfield on Okinawa.

The 22nd Bombardment Group operating B-24s was based at Angaur from November 1944 until January 1945 when it moved to Guiuan Airfield in the Philippines.

Postwar
In April 2010 the Palau Senate passed a resolution asking the President to offer Angaur airstrip as a site for the relocation of Marine Corps Air Station Futenma on Okinawa.

In 2020 a joint U.S. civil/military team carried out the Angaur Airfield Joint Improvement Project to improve the runway with the work completed by 27 August. The runway improvements give Palau a secondary airfield capable of handling cargo aircraft to back up to Roman Tmetuchl International Airport.

Facilities and aircraft
For the 12-month period ending May 23, 1987, the airport had 1,500 air taxi aircraft operations, an average of 125 per month.

Airlines and destinations

See also
 USAAF in the Central Pacific

References

External links
 www.pacificwrecks.com
 

Airfields of the United States Army Air Forces in the Pacific Ocean theatre of World War II
Airports in Palau
Angaur
Airports established in 1944